Mount Astley is a  mountain summit located in the Palliser Range of the Canadian Rockies in Alberta, Canada. It is situated in Banff National Park above Lake Minnewanka. It was named after Charles D'Oyley Astley, who ran the boat concession on the lake in the late 1800s.


Geology

Mount Astley is composed of sedimentary rock laid down during the Precambrian to Jurassic periods. Formed in shallow seas, this sedimentary rock was pushed east and over the top of younger rock during the Laramide orogeny.

Climate

Based on the Köppen climate classification, Mount Astley is located in a subarctic climate with cold, snowy winters, and mild summers.

See also
Geography of Alberta

References

External links
 Mount Astley weather: Mountain Forecast
 Parks Canada web site: Banff National Park

Two-thousanders of Alberta
Alberta's Rockies
Mountains of Banff National Park